Mischief Makers was a children's television series created by National Telepix that debuted on television syndication in 1960. The fifteen-minute series consisted of shortened Our Gang silent shorts that were originally released through Pathé, as well as various shorts from rival series including Mickey McGuire, Buster Brown, and others. Films from Hal Roach's all animal series the Dippy Doo Dads were also occasionally shown. The series ended production in 1961, but continued to be aired by certain local television stations well into the 1970s, and even during the 80's in Latin America.

Overview
The series mainly featured shorts from Hal Roach's Our Gang series, but shorts from other series were also sometimes shown. Each episode ran about fifteen minutes, with the featured short only being about twelve minutes in length (the shorts originally ran about twenty minutes long).

The shorts were always given a new, relatively simple title (i.e. Every Man For Himself became Shoeshine Shop). Most of what was deleted from the shorts were from the first half of the film, though some of the first half were retained in the episodes. The deleted footage sometimes wound up in other episodes, known as 'hybrid episodes'; these contained clips from more than one short. The original inter-titles were usually cut, though a few episodes did retain some of the titles. To compensate for the absence of the titles, most episodes were narrated by two kids who are identified as 'Bobby' and 'Bunny'. Bunny typically used the catchphrase "Skeedly Skeedly!". Carnival-like music (composed by Jack Saunders) and rather inappropriate sound effects were also added onto the films.

Theme
The animated opening and closing theme featured a song titled "Hip, Hip, Hooray". It was written by Jack Saunders and Phyllis Brandell Saunders. An instrumental version of this song was among the several soundtrack tunes added onto the silent films.

The animation was produced by Gene Deitch. It featured four animated characters in front of a picket fence doing various activities. The animated characters were a fat kid with a beanie hat (probably meant to be Joe Cobb, a girl (probably Mary Kornman), a freckled-face boy (probably Mickey Daniels), and a dog with a ring around his eye (obviously meant to be Pete the Pup).

Narration
Most episodes were narrated by two kids identified as 'Bobby' and 'Bunny'. The way the two interact with each other makes it seem plausible that the two are intended to be siblings, with Bobby being the older of the two. When narrating an episode, they typically leave very little space in between their comments. Today, most fans of the Our Gang series who have come across narrated Mischief Makers episodes find the narration to be rather irritating.

The writers for the narration sometimes gave rather odd names to some of the kids in the shorts. Others however were identified by their familiar names. Our Gang members  Mickey, Mary, Ernie, Farina, Jackie, and Johnny all had their familiar names retained. Meanwhile, Joe Cobb was called 'Joey', Jack Davis was referred to as 'Rocky', and Jay R. Smith was called 'Freckles'.

Episode List
Currently Incomplete

[*] indicates hybrid episode with more than one short used.

Episode production numbers for the following titles are still unknown.
Sparky the Star
Summer Daze (Buster Brown short)
Sparky at School (Buster Brown short)
Monkey Mischief
Rival Circus
The Monkey Story

Comedy Capers
After the cancellation of Mischief Makers, National Telepix produced Comedy Capers, a spin-off series consisting of various comedy films produced by Hal Roach and Mack Sennett. Top billing for the series went to Laurel and Hardy (even though very few of their films as a team were shown), Ben Turpin, Harry Langdon, Billy Bevan, and The Keystone Kops. Other films shown starred Will Rogers, Charley Chase, Snub Pollard, Billy West, Larry Semon, Clyde Cook, and Mabel Normand, among others.

The beginning to the opening theme immediately recognized the series as a spin-off of Mischief Makers, as the singers of the theme song mention "The Mischief Makers present...". Although actual Our Gang shorts were not featured on Comedy Capers, the opening theme featured clips from Our Gang shorts Official Officers and Playin' Hookey.

References

External links
The Lucky Corner - Our Gang, Little Rascals
Mischief Makers Copyright Status
Mischief Makers Copyright Status 2
Mischief Makers Copyright Status 3
Mischief Makers Copyright Status 4
Mischief Makers Opening and Closing
The Barber Shop (part 1) (dubbed)
The Barber Shop (part 2) (dubbed)
The Secret Meeting (part 1) (dubbed)
The Secret Meeting (part 2) (dubbed)
A Double Birthday (part 1) (dubbed)
A Double Birthday (part 2) (dubbed)
Little Officers (part 1) (dubbed)
Little Officers (part 2) (dubbed)
A Roamin' Holiday (part 1) (dubbed)
A Roamin' Holiday (part 2) (dubbed)
The Big Switch (excerpt) (dubbed)
Comedy Capers Do Detectives Think?
Comedy Capers Opening Theme (announcer dubbed)

1960 American television series debuts
1961 American television series endings
1960s American children's television series
First-run syndicated television programs in the United States